Ochyra is a surname. Notable people with the surname include:

 Emil Ochyra (1936–1980), Polish fencer
 Ryszard Ochyra (born 1949), Polish bryologist